is a passenger railway station located in the city of Uwajima, Ehime Prefecture, Japan. It is operated by JR Shikoku.

Lines

Layout
The station, which is staffed, consists of two ground-level bay platforms serving three tracks.

History
With the nationalization of Uwajima Railway on 1 August 1933, the station came under the control of Japanese Government Railways (JGR), later becoming Japanese National Railways (JNR).

With the privatization of JNR on 1 April 1987, control passed to JR Shikoku.

Surrounding area
Uwajima Castle 
Uwajima City Date Museum
 Uwajima City Hall

See also
 List of railway stations in Japan

References

External links
Official home page

Railway stations in Ehime Prefecture
Yodo Line
Yosan Line
Railway stations in Japan opened in 1914
Uwajima, Ehime